Abramovo is a rural locality (a village) in Kosinskoye Rural Settlement of Kosinsky District, Perm Krai, Russia. The population was 66 as of 2010. There is 1 street.

Geography 
Abramovo is located 2 km west of Kosa (the district's administrative centre) by road. Kosa is the nearest rural locality.

References 

Rural localities in Kosinsky District